3-Deoxy-D-arabinoheptulosonate 7-phosphate (DAHP) synthase is the first enzyme in a series of metabolic reactions known as the shikimate pathway, which is responsible for the biosynthesis of the amino acids phenylalanine, tyrosine, and tryptophan. Since it is the first enzyme in the shikimate pathway, it controls the amount of carbon entering the pathway. Enzyme inhibition is the primary method of regulating the amount of carbon entering the pathway. Forms of this enzyme differ between organisms, but can be considered DAHP synthase based upon the reaction that is catalyzed by this enzyme.

In enzymology, a DAHP synthase is an enzyme that catalyzes the chemical reaction

phosphoenolpyruvate + D-erythrose 4-phosphate + H2O  3-deoxy-D-arabino-hept-2-ulosonate 7-phosphate + phosphate

The three substrates of this enzyme are phosphoenolpyruvate, D-erythrose 4-phosphate, and H2O, whereas its two products are 3-deoxy-D-arabino-hept-2-ulosonate 7-phosphate and phosphate.

Nomenclature 

This enzyme belongs to the family of transferases, to be specific those transferring aryl or alkyl groups other than methyl groups.  The systematic name of this enzyme class is phosphoenolpyruvate:D-erythrose-4-phosphate C-(1-carboxyvinyl)transferase (phosphate-hydrolysing, 2-carboxy-2-oxoethyl-forming). Other names in common use include 2-dehydro-3-deoxy-phosphoheptonate aldolase, 2-keto-3-deoxy-D-arabino-heptonic acid 7-phosphate synthetase, 3-deoxy-D-arabino-2-heptulosonic acid 7-phosphate synthetase, 3-deoxy-D-arabino-heptolosonate-7-phosphate synthetase, 3-deoxy-D-arabino-heptulosonate 7-phosphate synthetase, 7-phospho-2-keto-3-deoxy-D-arabino-heptonate D-erythrose-4-phosphate, lyase (pyruvate-phosphorylating), 7-phospho-2-dehydro-3-deoxy-D-arabino-heptonate, D-erythrose-4-phosphate lyase (pyruvate-phosphorylating), D-erythrose-4-phosphate-lyase, D-erythrose-4-phosphate-lyase (pyruvate-phosphorylating), DAH7-P synthase, DAHP synthase, DS-Co, DS-Mn, KDPH synthase, KDPH synthetase, deoxy-D-arabino-heptulosonate-7-phosphate synthetase, phospho-2-dehydro-3-deoxyheptonate aldolase, phospho-2-keto-3-deoxyheptanoate aldolase, phospho-2-keto-3-deoxyheptonate aldolase, phospho-2-keto-3-deoxyheptonic aldolase, and phospho-2-oxo-3-deoxyheptonate aldolase.

Biological function
The primary function of DAHP synthase is to catalyze the reaction of phosphoenolpyruvate and D-erythrose 4-phosphate to DAHP and phosphate. However, another biological function of the enzyme is to regulate the amount of carbon that enters the shikimate pathway. This is accomplished primarily through two different methods, feedback inhibition and transcriptional control. Feedback inhibition and transcriptional control are both mechanisms of regulating carbon in bacteria, but the only mechanism of regulation found in DAHP synthase found in plants is transcriptional control.

In Escherichia coli, a species of bacteria, DAHP synthase is found as three isoenzymes, each of which sensitive to one of the amino acids produced in the shikimate pathway. In a study of DAHP synthase sensitive to tyrosine in E. coli, it was determined that the enzyme is inhibited by tyrosine through noncompetitive inhibition with respect to phosphoenolpyruvate, the first substrate of the reaction catalyzed by DAHP synthase, while the enzyme is inhibited by tyrosine through competitive inhibition with respect to D-erythrose 4-phosphate, the second substrate of the reaction catalyzed by DAHP synthase when the concentration of tyrosine is above 10 μM. It was also determined that the enzyme is inhibited by inorganic phosphate through noncompetitive inhibition with respect to both substrates and inhibited by DAHP through competitive inhibition with respect to phosphoenolpyruvate and noncompetitive inhibition with respect to D-erythrose 4-phosphate. Studies of product inhibition have shown that phosphoenolpyruvate is the first substrate to bind to the enzyme complex, inorganic phosphate is the first product to dissociate from the enzyme complex. Thus the amount of carbon entering the shikimate pathway can be controlled by inhibiting DAHP synthase from catalyzing the reaction that forms DAHP.

Carbon flow into the shikimate pathway in plants is regulated by transcriptional control. This method is also found in bacteria, but feedback inhibition is more prevalent.  In plants, as the plants progressed through the growth cycle, the activity of DAHP synthase changed.

Catalytic activity
Metal ions are required in order for DAHP synthase to catalyze reactions. In DAHP synthase, it has been shown that binding site contains patterns of cysteine and histidine residues bound to metal ions in a Cys-X-X-His fashion.

It has been shown that, in general, DAHP synthases require a bivalent metal ion cofactor in order for the enzyme to function properly. Metal ions that can function as cofactors include Mn2+, Fe2+, Co2+, Zn2+, Cu2+, and Ca2+. Studies have suggested that one metal ion bonds to each monomer of DAHP synthase.

The reaction catalyzed by DAHP synthase is shown below.

Structure 

The quaternary structure of DAHP synthase consists of two tightly bound dimers, which means that DAHP synthase is a tetramer.

To the right is an image of DAHP synthase that shows the quaternary structure of DAHP synthase. This image shows that DAHP synthase consists of two tightly bound dimers. Each of the monomer chains is colored differently.

Below the first image to the right is an image of DAHP synthase that also shows quaternary structure, however this image is in a cartoon view. This view also shows each of the four monomers colored differently. In addition, this view can also be used to show secondary and tertiary structures. As shown, two of the monomers have beta sheets that interact on one side of the enzyme, while the other two monomers have beta sheets that interact on the opposite side.

Structural studies

References

Further reading 

 
 
 

EC 2.5.1
Cadmium enzymes
Enzymes of known structure